Ziębice  is a town in Ząbkowice Śląskie County, Lower Silesian Voivodeship, in south-western Poland.

It is the seat of the administrative district (gmina) called Gmina Ziębice.

As of 2019, the town has a population of 8,708.

History
The area became part of the emerging Polish state under its first historic ruler Mieszko I in the 10th century. The town was first mentioned in 1234 under the Old Polish spelling Sambice. As a result of the fragmentation of Poland, it formed part of the duchies of Silesia until 1290, Świdnica until 1322, and afterwards it was the capital of a small eponymous duchy, remaining under the rule of the Piast dynasty until 1521. In 1344, a court was established in the town by the Piast dukes.

In 1521 it passed to the Podiebrad family, and in 1569 it passed to the kings of Bohemia. The town suffered in the Hussite Wars and Thirty Years' War, and in 1643, it was hit by an epidemic. In 1742, it became part of Prussia and was the capital of Kreis Münsterberg. In 1842, the town had a population of 3,946, predominantly Catholic by confession. In 1871, it became part of the German Empire along with the bulk of Silesia. Following Germany's defeat in World War II, in 1945, it became again part of Poland and its German population was expelled  in accordance with the Potsdam Agreement.

Culture
Ziębice hosts Poland's only Museum of Home Appliances.

Sports
The local football club is Sparta Ziębice. It competes in the lower leagues.

Notable people
 Karl Denke (1860–1924), serial killer 
 Edyta Górniak (born 1972), singer
 Janusz Kamiński (born 1959), cinematographer
 Karl Weigert (1845–1904), pathologist

Twin towns – sister cities
See twin towns of Gmina Ziębice.

Gallery

References

External links

 Jewish Community in Ziębice on Virtual Shtetl

Cities and towns in Lower Silesian Voivodeship
Ząbkowice Śląskie County